Santa Praxedes, officially the Municipality of Santa Praxedes, is a 5th class municipality in the province of Cagayan, Philippines. According to the 2020 census, it has a population of 4,434 people.

The poblacion of the municipality consists of two barangays, Centro-Uno and Centro-Dos, which are situated in the valley surrounded by the northern tip of the Cordilleras.

History
The town's original name was Langangan, then changed to Santa Praxedes, after the second-century martyr of the same name, by virtue of Republic Act No. 4149 in 1964. The first settlers were known to be the emigrants from the neighboring provinces of Ilocos Sur (from the municipalities of Sinait and Magsingal) and Ilocos Norte (from the municipalities of Pasuquin, Badoc and Pinili).

There has also been past and present moves by the municipal council to regain political control of some barangays of the neighboring municipality of Claveria, particularly the barangays of Cadcadir, Lablabig, Mabnang, Union, Kilkiling and Siam-Siam. These barangays were once part of Santa Praxedes but lost political control when the municipality was transferred to the provincial jurisdiction of Ilocos Norte.

Early Settlers
Early settlers in this municipality are the  Agamanos, Agnir, Aguinaldo, Aguirre''', Agullana, Bumanglag, Estabillo, Llapitan, Madamba, Pagdilao, Ragsac, Rivera, Sanchez'' families.

Geography
It borders the Ilocos Norte municipality of Pagudpud to the west; Calanasan, Apayao, to the south-west; Claveria, Cagayan, to the east. It also shares a third of the area of the Calvario National Park along with the municipality of Pagudpud. Taiwan directly to the north of Luzon Island via Luzon Strait to Bashi Channel.

The central plain is situated in a valley enveloped by the Caraballo Mountains. It is also one of the coastal towns of Cagayan that does not have direct road access to its seacoast due to the high mountains surrounding it.

Barangays
Santa Praxedes is politically subdivided into 10 barangays. These barangays are headed by elected officials: Barangay Captain, Barangay Council, whose members are called Barangay Councilors. All are elected every three years.

 Cadongdongan
 Capacuan
 Centro I (Poblacion)
 Centro II (Poblacion)
 Macatel
 Portabaga
 San Juan
 San Miguel
 Salungsong
 Sicul

Climate

As in the other part of the country, the municipality has two seasons: the wet and dry seasons. It has a longer wet season, unlike most parts of the country that enjoy almost equal periods of wet and dry seasons. The wet season normally starts in the last week of May and lasts up to the end of January. It is during the later months of this season that the famous "gamet" or "nori" grows along its rocky seacoast. The dry season starts by the end of January till the end of May.

Demographics

Language
Ilocano is the main language but a portion of the population also speaks Isneg (locally known as Yapayao) as part of the population hailed from the Calanasan, Apayao, when the municipality was a part of the former Kalinga-Apayao province.

Economy

Economic activity consists mainly of fishing, farming and tourism. Currently, the local government is further developing both Portabaga Falls and Mingay Beach Resorts.

Tourism
There is a lot of potential of the town in ecotourism but due to poor infrastructure, tourism spots such as Sicul Falls and Hotsprings as well as Macatel Falls were seldom visited.

 Portabaga Falls Resort - a 25-meter single-drop waterfall having four downstream catch pools
 Mingay Beach and Resorts
 Sicul Falls and Hotspring
 Macatel Falls

Government
Santa Praxedez, belonging to the second legislative district of the province of Cagayan, is governed by a mayor designated as its local chief executive and by a municipal council as its legislative body in accordance with the Local Government Code. The mayor, vice mayor, and the councilors are elected directly by the people through an election which is being held every three years.

Elected officials

Controversy
Being a small town and the fact that its inhabitants are related by ancestry, recent political development created friction among political clans. Among other factor is that politicians are mainly late-comer emigrants from neighboring municipalities and provinces thus in the 2016 national election, claims of illegal voters or "flying voters" were uncovered by the local election office. Such controversy was resolved before election.

Infrastructure

Bus companies serving the town are RCJ Lines and GV Florida Transport (Manila–Sanchez Mira v/v via Laoag), GMW Trans (Laoag–Tuguegarao/Santiago) and L. Pascua Liner (Flora–Baguio) on a daily regular basis.

Communication
Although it has a small population, it enjoys full coverage of Smart and Globe cellular networks which residents use to connect to the Internet.

Education
The Schools Division of Cagayan governs the town's public education system. The division office is a field office of the DepEd in Cagayan Valley region. The office governs the public and private elementary and public and private high schools throughout the municipality.

Elementary
 Santa Praxedes Central School
 Cadongdongan Elementary School
 Capacuan Elementary School

Secondary
 Santa Praxedes National High School and Senior High School

References

External links
[ Philippine Standard Geographic Code]
Philippine Census Information

Municipalities of Cagayan